Turdiev (Russian and Tajik: Турдиев) is a jamoat in Tajikistan. It is located in Hamadoni District in Khatlon Region. The jamoat has a total population of 11,095 (2020).

References

Populated places in Khatlon Region
Jamoats of Tajikistan